Kristy Hiria Hill (born 1 July 1979) is an association football player who represented New Zealand.

Hill made her Football Ferns debut in a 1–0 win over Argentina on 16 June 2008 and was included in the New Zealand squad for the 2008 Summer Olympics, playing in one group game; a 0–4 loss to the United States. She was also part of the New Zealand squad at the 2012 Summer Olympics.

References

External links
 

1979 births
Living people
New Zealand women's international footballers
New Zealand women's association footballers
Footballers at the 2008 Summer Olympics
Footballers at the 2012 Summer Olympics
Olympic association footballers of New Zealand
2011 FIFA Women's World Cup players
Women's association football defenders